Øl, mørke og depresjon (Beer, Darkness and Depression) is the first album by Norwegian black metal supergroup Den Saakaldte, released on  by Eerie Art Records.

Track listing

2008 debut albums
Den Saakaldte albums